St. Stephen Rural Cemetery is a municipal cemetery established in April 1856 at the town of St. Stephen, New Brunswick, Canada. The cemetery encompasses  of land with approximately 12,000 burials. There are over 20 kilometres of avenues and paths.

History
St. Stephen is a Canada/United States border town, separated by the St. Croix River. It is a place where crossing the bridge for employment, shopping, hospitalization, or just visiting friends, is an almost daily part of normal life. The two close-knit communities have shared services for more than two hundred years. Until nearly the second half of the 20th century, a number of Americans were born in St. Stephen and vice versa.

Cross-border marriages have been common and there are several American Civil War veterans buried in the St. Stephen cemetery, including a Medal of Honor recipient as well as Brigadier-General John Curtis Caldwell who was one of the eight generals to accompany the body of assassinated President Abraham Lincoln on its journey from Washington D.C. to Lincoln's home in Springfield, Illinois. Many members of the Ganong family of chocolate makers are interred here.

Notable interments
 John Curtis Caldwell, Brigadier-General, Union Army
 Arthur D. Ganong, businessman, president of Ganong Bros.
 Gilbert W. Ganong, co-founder of Ganong Bros.
 Hardy N. Ganong (CBE), Major-General, Canadian Army
 J. Edwin Ganong, businessman, co-founder of Ganong Bros. and the St. Croix Soap Mfg. Co.
 Joan A. Ganong, World War II Air Force Flight Sergeant, author
 R. Whidden Ganong, businessman, president of Ganong Bros.
 Susan B. Ganong, educator, owner of Netherwood School
 William Francis Ganong, botanist, historian, cartographer
 James Mitchell, Premier of New Brunswick
 Horatio Young, US Navy, Medal of Honor recipient

References
 Commonwealth War Graves Commission report on St. Stephen Rural Cemetery

Cemeteries in New Brunswick
Buildings and structures in Charlotte County, New Brunswick
St. Stephen, New Brunswick
1856 establishments in New Brunswick
Tourist attractions in Charlotte County, New Brunswick